Maiya Williams (born December 18, 1962, in Corvallis, Oregon) is an American author, television producer, and screenwriter.

Early life
The daughter of a forester, Williams grew up in New Haven, Connecticut and Berkeley, California.  She attended Berkeley High School, and graduated from Harvard College in 1984 where she was the first African-American officer of The Harvard Lampoon.

Career
Williams has written and produced various television series including Roc, Amen, The Fresh Prince of Bel Air, The Wayans Bros., MAD TV, Rugrats, Futurama and The Haunted Hathaways.

Williams wrote her first book for children, The Golden Hour, in 2004. A time travel adventure set in the French Revolution, it was followed by The Hour of the Cobra (2006),  set in ancient Egypt, and The Hour of the Outlaw (2007), set in nineteenth century California. The Fizzy Whiz Kid: The Rise and Fall of a Hollywood Nobody, a contemporary cautionary tale about fame, was published in 2010. Her most recent book is Middle School Cool (2014).

Personal life
Williams lives in Pacific Palisades with TV writer Patric M. Verrone, their children, and dog.

References

1962 births
American television writers
American women television producers
American women screenwriters
Living people
Writers from Corvallis, Oregon
American women television writers
Harvard College alumni
The Harvard Lampoon alumni
Screenwriters from Oregon
21st-century American women writers
21st-century American screenwriters
African-American screenwriters
21st-century African-American women writers
21st-century African-American writers
20th-century African-American people
20th-century African-American women
Television producers from Oregon